Events from the year 1831 in the United States.

Incumbents

Federal Government 
 President: Andrew Jackson (D-Tennessee)
 Vice President: John C. Calhoun (D-South Carolina)
 Chief Justice: John Marshall (Virginia)
 Speaker of the House of Representatives: Andrew Stevenson (D-Virginia)
 Congress: 21st (until March 4), 22nd (starting March 4)

Events

January–March
 January 1 – William Lloyd Garrison begins publishing The Liberator, an antislavery newspaper, in Boston, Massachusetts.
 March 18 – Cherokee Nation v. Georgia: An injunction requested by the Cherokee nation, claiming that Georgia's state legislature had created laws which, "go directly to annihilate the Cherokees as a political society", is denied.

April–June
 April 18 – The University of Alabama is founded.
 April 21 – New York University is founded in New York City.

July–September
 August 7 – American Baptist minister William Miller preaches his first sermon on the Second Advent of Christ in Dresden, New York, launching the Advent Movement in the United States.
August 21 – Outbreak of Nat Turner's slave rebellion in Southampton County, Virginia. Approximately 55 whites are stabbed, shot and clubbed to death.

October–December
October 30 – In Southampton County, Virginia, escaped slave Nat Turner is captured and arrested for leading the bloodiest slave revolt in United States history.
November 5 – Slave leader Nat Turner is tried, convicted, and sentenced to death in Virginia for inciting a violent slave uprising.
November 11 – In Jerusalem, Virginia, Nat Turner is hanged.

Undated
 Alexis de Tocqueville visits the United States.
 Founding of:
 Wesleyan University in Middletown, Connecticut.
 Xavier University in Cincinnati, Ohio (as "The Athenaeum").

Births
 January 2 – Justin Winsor, historian and librarian (died 1897)
 January 14 – William D. Washburn, U.S. Senator from Minnesota from 1889 to 1895 and businessman (died 1912)
 January 15 – Ozora P. Stearns, U.S. Senator from Minnesota in 1871 (died 1896)
 January 26 – Mary Mapes Dodge, children's writer (died 1907)
 February 23 – Elizabeth Litchfield Cunnyngham, missionary and church worker (died 1911)
 March 3 – George Pullman, inventor and industrialist (died 1897)
 March 6 – Philip Sheridan, general (died 1888)
 March 12 – Clement Studebaker, automobile pioneer (died 1901)
 March 14 – Edward A. Perry, Governor of Florida (died 1889)
 March 20 – Solomon L. Spink, U.S. Congressman from Illinois (died 1881)
 May 16 – Daniel Manning, businessman, journalist and politician, Secretary of the Treasury (died 1887)
 June 1 or 29 {exact date unknown) – John Bell Hood, Confederate general (died 1879)
 July 5 – Cordelia A. Greene, physician, reformer, benefactor (died 1905)
 July 8 – John Pemberton, inventor of Coca-Cola (died 1888)
 July 21 – Martha Maxwell, naturalist and artist (died 1881)
 August 26 – Lucy Hayes, First Lady of the United States as wife of Rutherford B. Hayes (died 1889)
 September 3 – States Rights Gist, lawyer, militia general in South Carolina and  Confederate Army brigadier general (died 1864)
 September 10 – William A. Peffer, U.S. Senator from Kansas from 1891 to 1897 (died 1912)
 September 20 – Kate Harrington, poet, teacher and writer (died 1917)
 September 29 – John Schofield, general (died 1906)
 October 15 – Helen Hunt Jackson, poet, writer and activist (died 1885)
 October 16 – Lucy Stanton, abolitionist (died 1910)
 October 28 – Charles Colcock Jones, Jr., Georgia politician, attorney, historian and folklorist (died 1893)
 October 29 – Othniel Charles Marsh, paleontologist (died 1899)
 October 31 – Romualdo Pacheco, Governor of California (died 1899)
 November 19 – James A. Garfield, 20th President of the United States from March to September 1881 (died 1881)
 November 21 – John Franklin Miller, U.S. Senator from California from 1881 to 1886 (died 1886)
 November 22 – Thomas J. Latham, lawyer and businessman (died 1911)
 December 19 – Bernice Pauahi Bishop, Hawaiian alii (died 1884)

Deaths
 March 26 – Richard Allen, founder of the African Methodist Episcopal Church in 1794 (born 1760)
 April 4 – Isaiah Thomas, publisher (born 1749)
 May 11 – John Trumbull, poet (born 1750)
 May 24 – 
James Peale, miniaturist and still-life painter (born 1749)
Benjamin Carr, composer, singer, teacher, and music publisher (born 1768)
 May 27 – Jedediah Smith, explorer, hunter, trapper and fur trader (born 1799)
 July 4 – James Monroe, fifth President of the United States from 1817 to 1825 (born 1758)
 November 11 – Nat Turner, leader of slave rebellion (born 1800)
 December 8 – James Hoban, architect of the White House (born 1755 in Ireland)

See also
Timeline of United States history (1820–1859)

References

External links
 

 
1830s in the United States
United States
United States
Years of the 19th century in the United States